Rugless may refer to:

Rugless, Kentucky, a community in Lewis County, Kentucky
Troy Rugless, a former English rugby player